Radojević is a Serbian surname, a patronymic derived from the masculine given name Radoje. It may refer to:

 Aleksandar Radojević (born 1976), basketball player
 Goran Radojević (born 1963), football player
 Miloš Radojević (born 1986), football player
 Prvoslav Radojević, Serbian nobleman

Serbian surnames